FK Pelister is a Macedonian football club based in the city of Bitola, North Macedonia. They are currently competing in the Macedonian Second League.

History
FK Pelister, was formed in 1945. In 1946 they won the Bitola regional title and that same year they merged with Rabotnik. They won the Bitola title in 1950 and 1951 again. During that time the most influential players were: Georgievski, Dimitrovski, Petrovski, Naumovski, Lazarevski, Sekerdžievski, Avramovski, Nestorov and Eftimovski.

The team played primarily in the lower divisions of the former SFR Yugoslavia and were champions of the Macedonian Republic League four times, along with winning the Macedonian Republic Cup four times in 1959, 1962, 1985 and 1991. They earned promotion to the Yugoslav Second League Group East, which included clubs from Serbia, Montenegro and Macedonia, for the first time in 1974, which was a big success for that generation. Some of the most famous players at the time were: Grbevski, Dukovski, Cvetkovski, Taškov, Bogoevski, Gočevski, Ristevski, Tristovski, Mickovski, Dimovski, Markovski, Upalevski and the manager Stavre Eftimovski. Soon after, they were relegated but made another comeback in 1982 with Mitko Butlevski as chairman and Ivan Čabrinović as manager. The biggest success came in the 1990–91 Yugoslav Cup when they reached the 1/8 final, getting eliminated on away goals by the eventual champions Hajduk Split. Pelister played their final season in the Yugoslav league system in the 1991–92 Yugoslav First League finishing in 15th place.

Following the formation of the First Macedonian Football League, Pelister had early success consistently finishing in the Top 5. They also made it to the Macedonian Cup final the first two seasons coming up short both times. The club became rivals with Vardar Skopje which created the Eternal derby of Macedonia and continued the Pelagonia regional derby with Pobeda Prilep. In 2000, Pelister became the first team in independent Macedonia to reach the third phase of a European competition. They made it to round three of the 2000 UEFA Intertoto Cup, losing 1–5 on aggregate to one of the winners Celta de Vigo. Finally, the club earned its first major trophy in 2001 by winning the 2000–01 Macedonian Cup, after which they played in the UEFA Cup. In 2003, the team fell on hard times caused by financial problems and was relegated. A few years later, former players Mitko Stojkovski and Toni Micevski were able to save the club from collapse. After taking over the club they brought instant success with the team winning the 2005–06 Macedonian Second League title. The following year they made a successful comeback to the Macedonian First League and got to the 2006–07 Macedonian Cup semifinal. In the 2007–08 season, the club had its best season to date finishing in 3rd place. Once again, they played in the UEFA Cup where they lost 0–1 on aggregate to APOEL. Another case of financial difficulties and poor results, once again relegated them back to second division for the 2011–12 season. This time, however, relying mostly on young players from Bitola and led by captain Dragan Dimitrovski, Pelister made an immediate return to the top division, but after the 2014–15 season, the club was once again relegated. This time it happened under the managerial leadership of Gjoko Hadžievski and new owner Cermat, represented by Zoran Ristevski. Under the ownership of Cermat and municipality of Bitola, after being relegated the team has continued to languish in the second division. But, after a following season, the club was again immediately returned to the First League, despite the relegation battle in one time. In the following season, the club was won the 2016–17 Macedonian Cup for the second time, first time since 2001 and thus was played in the Europa League which was a first participation in the European competitions since 2008. But unfortunately its not an end of the turbulent period for the Bitola club, in which they threaten a relegation for the fourth time, after a two seasons in First League, the problems is deeper because players and the board were leaving the club, and a facing financial trouble. Pelister was relegated at the end of the season, although playing another final of the 2017–18 Macedonian Cup.

The club focuses heavily on youth players from the Bitola region with a strong talent development. Gjorgji Hristov, Dragi Kanatlarovski, Toni Micevski, Nikolče Noveski, Toni Savevski and Mitko Stojkovski are some of the famous Bitola natives to start their careers with the club. Therefore, Pelister is known as the nursery of young and talented players who have left and gone to have success on various clubs in Macedonia and abroad.

Colours and crest

The club colours have traditionally been green and white. The crest is formed in a shape of a shield, at the top left corner it has always had the number 1945 inscribed, which is the year of the club's foundation. In the latest version it includes the Cyrillic letters FK, on the right side. Shape of a mountain forms in the backdrop (to honor the mountain peak Pelister) with the name of the club in the center and a classic leather football underneath it. Early versions of the crest included the colour black, but now the entire badge uses only two colours, green and white.

Prior to the 2016 season, Australian club Pascoe Vale FC (Formerly Pascoe Vale Pelister) announced they would adopt a new logo, inspired by that of FK Pelister, to tie back to their original namesake and immigrant origins.

Supporters

Čkembari are an Ultras group, established in 1985, who support the Macedonian sports clubs from Bitola that compete under the Pelister banner, mainly FK Pelister in football and RK Pelister in handball. The group was founded in 1985 when a caravan of 15 buses traveled to support RK Pelister who was playing against Partizan Bjelovar in a handball relegation play-off match. At that time they used the name BMČM – Bitolčani, Motorcyclists, Čkembari, Macedonians later shortened to just Čkembari. Soon after, the first green and white banners were created that read: „Hell Boys“ and „Green Conquerors“ which started organized support for Pelister at every match.

Rivalries

The club's main rival is FK Vardar from Skopje; their matches are called the Eternal derby of Macedonia. Other significant rivals are FK Pobeda (Pelagonia derby), FK Rabotnički (one of the Skopje-Bitola rivalries); and other clubs with an Albanian background (mainly FK Shkëndija and FK Shkupi).

Honours

 Macedonian Republic League:
Winners (7): 1949–50, 1950–51, 1956–57, 1959–60, 1960–61, 1974–75, 1981–82

 Macedonian Second League:
Winners (2): 2005–06, 2011–12

 Macedonian Republic Cup:
Winners (4): 1959, 1962, 1985, 1991

 Macedonian Football Cup:
Winners (2): 2000–01, 2016–17
Runners-up (3): 1992–93, 1993–94, 2017–18

Recent seasons

1The 2019–20 season was abandoned due to the COVID-19 pandemic in North Macedonia.

Pelister in Europe

Results

UEFA club competition record

Club rankings

UEFA club coefficient ranking
(As of 25 September 2021)

Club records in UEFA competitions
Biggest Win in UEFA Competition: 17/06/2000, Pelister 3–1 Hobscheid, at Bitola
Biggest Defeat in UEFA Competition: 30/06/2017, Lech Poznań 4–0 Pelister, at Poznań
Club Appearances in UEFA Competition: 4
Player with Most UEFA Appearances:  Mile Dimov – 9 appearances
Top Scorer in UEFA Club Competitions:  Ilir Elmazovski and  Martin Georgievski – 3 goals

Players

Current squad
As of 19 January 2023.

Club officials

Technical staff

Historical list of coaches

 Stavre Eftimovski
 Ivan Čabrinović
 Gjoko Hadjievski (1988 – 1990)
 Tome Dimitrovski (1990 – 1992)
 Kire Gruevski (1992 – 1993)
 Zoran Smileski
 Ilija Dimoski
  Dushan Kechan  (1995 – 1996)
 Nexhat Husein (1999)
 Kiril Dojchinovski (2000)
 Branko Božić (2000)
 Spase Ristevski (2001)
 Blagoja Kitanovski (2001 – 2002)
 Perica Gruevski (2003)
 Marjan Sekulovski (2004 – 2007)
 Nexhat Husein (2007 – Nov 2008)
 Zlatko Cvetanovski (interim) (16 Nov 2008 - Feb 2009)
 Alekso Mackov (1 Mar 2009 - Sep 2009)
 Gjoko Ilievski (29 Sep 2009 - Oct 2009)
 Naum Ljamchevski (6 Oct 2009 - Sep 2010)
 Nexhat Husein (24 Sep 2010 – Jun 2011)
 Marjan Sekulovski (2011 – 2012)
 Mile Dimov (interim) (2012)
 Gorazd Mihajlov (Jul 2012 - Dec 2012)
 Gordan Zdravkov (11 Jan 2013 - May 2013)
 Mile Dimov (interim) (6 May 2013 – Jun 2013)
 Dragan Bocheski (Jul 2013 – Jun 2014)
 Marjan Sekulovski (Jul 2014 - Nov 2014)
 Dimitar Kapinkovski (interim) (24 Nov 2014 - Dec 2014)
 Gjoko Hadžievski (4 Dec 2014 – 2015)
 Naum Ljamchevski (Jul 2015 - Oct 2016)
 Naci Şensoy (Oct 2016 – Jul 2017)
 Srgjan Zaharievski (19 Jul 2017 – 26 Oct 2017)
 Spase Ristevski (interim) (Nov 2017 – 31 Dec 2017)
 Marjan Sekulovski (Jan 2018 – Apr 2018)
 Nexhat Husein (2018)
 Tome Trajanovski (2018)
 Darko Krsteski (2018 – 2019)
 Zoran Shterjovski (2019-2020)
 Dimitar Kapinkovski (2021)
 Marjan Sekulovski (2022)
 Boban Babunski (2023 – )

References

External links
Official website 
Facebook Page 
Club Info at MacedonianFootball 
Football Federation of Macedonia 

 
Pelister
Association football clubs established in 1945
1945 establishments in the Socialist Republic of Macedonia
Pelister